Villanueva Saravia Pinto (1964–1998) was a Uruguayan political figure.

Background

He was the great-great-grandson of Aparicio Saravia, the prominent Uruguayan National (Blanco) Party and Civil War leader, who died following the Battle of Masoller in 1904, and who had a strong following in Cerro Largo.

He was the great-great-great nephew of Gumercindo Saravia, Civil War Leader in Rio Grande, Brazil, which borders on the Uruguayan Department of Cerro Largo, of which Villanueva Saravia served as the elected leader.

His mother committed suicide when he was a child.

Political office

He was the elected leader of the regional administration of Cerro Largo, from 1994 and became notably identified with maintaining criticism of political corruption. Cerro Largo is an area of the interior of Uruguay where the National Party (Uruguay) traditionally has strong support.

Death

Villanueva Saravia died in 1998, in circumstances which remain unclear. Various theories were propounded as to these, and widely debated in the local media.

See also

 Politics of Uruguay
 List of political families#Uruguay

References

1964 births
1998 deaths
Intendants of Cerro Largo Department
Uruguayan people of Portuguese descent
People from Cerro Largo Department
National Party (Uruguay) politicians